Mosammat Amirun Nesa Khanam, known by her stage name Rani Sarker (born 1931 or 1932 – died 7 July 2018) was a Bangladeshi film actress. She started her acting career in Bengali cinema in the 1960s.

In 2014, she was awarded Bangladesh National Film Award for Lifetime Achievement for her contribution to Bengali films.

Early life
Sarker was born on Sonatola village of Kaliganj Upazila of Satkhira District to Solaiman Mollah and Asia Khatun. She completed her primary education from Satkhira Sonatala UP school. Afterward, she passed the matriculation examination from Khulna Coronation Girls High School.

Career
Sarker debuted her acting career as a stage performer in 1958. In the same year, she got her breakthrough in the film Dur Hai Shukh Ka Gao, directed by A. J. Kardar. In 1962, she performed at Ehtesham's Urdu film Chanda. She got to play the lead role in two other notable films Talash and Notun Sur.

Filmography

References

External links
 

1930s births
2018 deaths
People from Satkhira District
Bangladeshi film actresses
National Film Award (Bangladesh) for Lifetime Achievement recipients
Date of birth missing
Burials at Azimpur Graveyard
Best Supporting Actress Bachsas Award winners